Microtus henseli, the Tyrrhenian vole or Hensel's vole, was a rodent found in Sardinia and Corsica. It is believed to have become extinct around 2000–3000 years ago, as a result of pressure and competition with dogs, foxes and weasels which were brought to the islands by humans. The humans themselves may have also played a role in the Tyrrhenian vole's extinction.

References

henseli
Holocene extinctions
Fossil taxa described in 1905